Carol Williams, born in Montclair, New Jersey, United States, is a vocalist and songwriter who achieved success with her disco songs in the 1970s. She was the first female artist signed to the disco label Salsoul Records.

Carol Williams was once a member of the post-disco/garage house studio project called Komiko.

Career
Williams began her career working with producer Vincent Montana, Jr. and the Salsoul Orchestra. Her most notable recording, "More", was very popular at a time when disco was just breaking into the mainstream. The success of "More" led to the Lectric Lady album, released on Salsoul Records in 1976 and featured the singles "Come Back" and "Love Is You". The latter song was sampled in 1999 by Italian DJ Spiller in an instrumental track called "Groove Jet", on the Mighty Miami EP, and in 2000 in the vocal version of the track, called "Groovejet (If This Ain't Love)" with vocals performed by Sophie Ellis-Bextor. The track featuring Ellis-Bextor reached number one in the UK and Australia, and sparked renewed demand for the original.

Not long after the release of her album, Williams parted Salsoul Records. In 1978 she signed with Canadian label Roy B. Quality Records where she recorded a duet with singer producer Tony Valor "Love Has Come My Way". Her second album Reflections of Carol Williams was issued in 1979 and featured the singles "Tell the World" and "Dance the Night Away".

1980s to present
She turned down Darryl Payne's song "Over Like a Fat Rat" and passed it to Fonda Rae because she wasn't fond of the concept of a song that is "about a rat," defending her position, "Anything I am singing has to make sense to me and tell a story." Rae's version which turned into a minor club hit was appraised by Williams, "[and] she did a fantastic job. The way they arranged it—it was amazing."

In 1982 she had a R&B hit "Can't Get Away (from Your Love)" on Vanguard label which did well on the Billboard dance chart peaking at number 38. "You've Reached the Bottom Line" was also a dance chart hit in 1983, and peaked at number 59.

Carol Williams is still performing spending up to ten hours a day in her Queens, New York City, recording studio. She actively does shows on disco flashback concerts and travels with her live band. Her songs have appeared on various Salsoul and Unidisc compilations.

In 2016 she co-wrote, co-produced and sang "It’s Gonna Be Different" with her musician son De-Verne Williams Jr.

Discography

Albums
 Lectric Lady (1976, Salsoul Records)
 Reflections of Carol Williams (1979, Quality Records)

Singles

References

External links
 

Year of birth missing (living people)
American disco musicians
American women pop singers
American dance musicians
American rhythm and blues singer-songwriters
People from Montclair, New Jersey
Salsoul Records artists
Living people
20th-century American women singers
21st-century American women singers
20th-century American singers
21st-century American singers